Daniel Alonso Chacón Salas (born 11 April 2001) is a Costa Rican professional footballer for Colorado Rapids 2 and the Costa Rica national football team.

Career
Chacón joined up with C.S. Cartaginés as a youngster and made his senior debut for the club on 19 November 2017 as a 16 year-old. He scored a first goal for the club on 27 September 2020 against Saprissa in a 2–1 victory. In 2020 he was linked with a move to Portuguese side G.D. Estoril Praia however the transfer fell through.  With his contract running out in 2022 Cachón was again linked with a move away, with interest reportedly coming from rival Liga FPD club Saprissa as well as from an unnamed Belgian side. In June 2022, Colorado Rapids 2 announced the signing of Chacón at the end of his contract with Cartaginés in the following month. His contract with Colorado lasts through the 2023 season. General manager Brian Crookham describing him as "one of the most talented players in an up-and-coming generation of Costa Rican players." In July 2022, Chacón was loaned back to Cartaginés for the remainder of the season, ending in October.

International career
Chacón represented his country at the 2017 FIFA U-17 World Cup. He made his debut for the senior Costa Rica side at 20 years-old, appearing as a substitute on 20 January 2022 during a 0–0 draw against Mexico. He made his first start for the national team on 30 March 2022 against the USA. On 14 June 2022, Chacon appeared as a substitute in the match where his country sealed qualification for the 2022 FIFA World Cup by beating New Zealand 1–0  to win the intercontinental playoff held in Qatar.

References

External links

2001 births
Living people
Costa Rican footballers
2022 FIFA World Cup players
Costa Rica international footballers
C.S. Cartaginés players